Mehrdad Karam Zadeh is a Paralympian athlete from Iran competing mainly in category F42 shot put and discus events.

Mehrdad competed in the F42 shot put at the 2004 Summer Paralympics in Athens where he won a bronze medal.  Four years later at the 2008 Summer Paralympics in Beijing he failed to medal in the shot put but won a silver medal in the F42 discus. In the London 2012 Paralympic Games, Mehrdad had another successful day by producing a silver medal in the F42 discus for Iran.

References

External links
 

Paralympic athletes of Iran
Athletes (track and field) at the 2004 Summer Paralympics
Athletes (track and field) at the 2008 Summer Paralympics
Paralympic silver medalists for Iran
Paralympic bronze medalists for Iran
Living people
Medalists at the 2004 Summer Paralympics
Medalists at the 2008 Summer Paralympics
Medalists at the 2012 Summer Paralympics
Athletes (track and field) at the 2012 Summer Paralympics
Year of birth missing (living people)
Paralympic medalists in athletics (track and field)
Iranian male discus throwers
Iranian male shot putters
Paralympic discus throwers
Paralympic shot putters
Medalists at the 2010 Asian Para Games
Medalists at the 2014 Asian Para Games